There are at least 250 named mountain passes in Wyoming.

Wyoming  is a state in the mountain region of the Western United States.  Wyoming is the 10th most extensive, but the least populous and the 2nd least densely populated of the 50 United States.  The western two thirds of the state is covered mostly with the mountain ranges and rangelands in the foothills of the Eastern Rocky Mountains, while the eastern third of the state is high elevation prairie known as the High Plains. 

 Adams Pass, Fremont County, Wyoming, el. 
 Angel Pass, Sublette County, Wyoming, el. 
 Antelope Gap, Platte County, Wyoming, el. 
 Backpackers Pass, Fremont County, Wyoming, el. 
 Bar C Gap, Johnson County, Wyoming, el. 
 Bare Pass, Sublette County, Wyoming, el. 
 Barlow Gap, Natrona County, Wyoming, el. 
 Batrum Gap, Fremont County, Wyoming, el. 
Battle Pass, Carbon County, Wyoming, el. 
 Bear Creek Pass, Fremont County, Wyoming, el. 
 Bear Cub Pass, Fremont County, Wyoming, el. 
 Bear Cub Pass, Teton County, Wyoming, el. 
 Bear Pass, Fremont County, Wyoming, el. 
 Beartooth Pass, Park County, Wyoming, el. 
 Beartrap Junction, Sublette County, Wyoming, el. 
 Beef Gap, Natrona County, Wyoming, el. 
 Bighorn Pass, Park County, Wyoming, el. 
 Birdseye Pass, Fremont County, Wyoming, el. 
 Bitch Creek Narrows, Teton County, Wyoming, el. 
 Black Gap, Niobrara County, Wyoming, el. 
 Black Rock Gap, Fremont County, Wyoming, el. 
 Blaurock Pass, Fremont County, Wyoming, el. 
 Blazon Gap, Lincoln County, Wyoming, el. 
 Bliss Pass, Park County, Wyoming, el. 
 Blondy Pass, Hot Springs County, Wyoming, el. 
 Blue Gap, Carbon County, Wyoming, el. 
 Boneside Pass, Carbon County, Wyoming, el. 
 Bonneville Pass, Fremont County, Wyoming, el. 
 Bonney Pass, Fremont County, Wyoming, el. 
 Bootjack Gap, Park County, Wyoming, el. 
 Bowles Pass, Fremont County, Wyoming, el. 
 Box Canyon Pass, Lincoln County, Wyoming, el. 
 Bridger Gap, Uinta County, Wyoming, el. 
 Bridger Pass, Carbon County, Wyoming, el. 
 Bull Elk Pass, Fremont County, Wyoming, el. 
 Bull Gap, Albany County, Wyoming, el. 
 Burwell Pass, Park County, Wyoming, el. 
 Cameron Pass, Albany County, Wyoming, el. 
 Camp Creek Saddle, Teton County, Wyoming, el. 
 Cannonball Cut, Albany County, Wyoming, el. 
 Carrot Knoll, Teton County, Wyoming, el. 
 Cedar Gap, Natrona County, Wyoming, el. 
 Cedar Pass, Carbon County, Wyoming, el. 
 Chamberlain Pass, Converse County, Wyoming, el. 
 Cheese Pass, Lincoln County, Wyoming, el. 
 Cheyenne Pass, Laramie County, Wyoming, el. 
 Christina Pass, Fremont County, Wyoming, el. 
 Cliff Creek Pass, Lincoln County, Wyoming, el. 
 Coal Chute Pass, Fremont County, Wyoming, el. 
 Conant Pass, Teton County, Wyoming, el. 
 Cony Pass, Fremont County, Wyoming, el. 
 Cottonwood Pass, Fremont County, Wyoming, el. 
 Cougar Pass, Fremont County, Wyoming, el. 
 Coyote Gap, Niobrara County, Wyoming, el. 
 Craig Pass, Teton County, Wyoming, el. 
 Crilly Gap, Natrona County, Wyoming, el. 
 Crooks Gap, Fremont County, Wyoming, el. 
 Crow Creek Pass, Park County, Wyoming, el. 
 Cube Rock Pass, Sublette County, Wyoming, el. 
 Cumberland Gap, Lincoln County, Wyoming, el. 
 Cyclone Pass, Fremont County, Wyoming, el. 
 Davis Pass, Fremont County, Wyoming, el. 
 De Pass, Fremont County, Wyoming, el. 
 Dead Horse Pass, Teton County, Wyoming, el. 
 Dead Indian Pass, Park County, Wyoming, el. 
 Deer Creek Pass, Park County, Wyoming, el. 
 Devils Gap, Fremont County, Wyoming, el. 
 Devils Gate, Natrona County, Wyoming, el. 
 Devils Pass, Converse County, Wyoming, el. 
 Deweys Gateway, Park County, Wyoming, el. 
 Dirty Gap, Natrona County, Wyoming, el. 
 Dull Knife Pass, Johnson County, Wyoming, el. 
 Dunraven Pass, Park County, Wyoming, el. 
 Dutch Oven Pass, Big Horn County, Wyoming, el. 
 Eagle Pass, Park County, Wyoming, el. 
 East Fork Pass, Fremont County, Wyoming, el. 
 Edelman Pass, Johnson County, Wyoming, el. 
 Elk Pass, Johnson County, Wyoming, el. 
 Ellison Pass, Albany County, Wyoming, el. 
 Elsie Col, Fremont County, Wyoming, el. 
 Emigrant Gap, Niobrara County, Wyoming, el. 
 Fackler Pass, Albany County, Wyoming, el. 
 Fawn Pass, Park County, Wyoming, el. 
 Fenton Pass, Big Horn County, Wyoming, el. 
 Fieldhouse Cut, Carbon County, Wyoming, el. 
 Fish Cut, Sweetwater County, Wyoming, el. 
 Florence Pass, Big Horn County, Wyoming, el. 
 Fontenelle Gap, Lincoln County, Wyoming, el. 
 Fox Creek Gap, Goshen County, Wyoming, el. 
 Fox Creek Pass, Teton County, Wyoming, el. 
 Fraker Pass, Johnson County, Wyoming, el. 
 Freighter Gap, Sweetwater County, Wyoming, el. 
 Geneva Pass, Big Horn County, Wyoming, el. 
 Glacier Pass, Fremont County, Wyoming, el. 
 Golden Gate, Park County, Wyoming, el. 
 Government Gap, Sheridan County, Wyoming, el. 
 Granite Pass, Sheridan County, Wyoming, el. 
 Grants Pass, Teton County, Wyoming, el. 
 Green River Pass, Sublette County, Wyoming, el. 
 Greybull Pass, Park County, Wyoming, el. 
 Gunsight Pass, Sublette County, Wyoming, el. 
 Gunsight Pass, Sublette County, Wyoming, el. 
 Gunsight Pass, Teton County, Wyoming, el. 
 Gunsight Pass, Lincoln County, Wyoming, el. 
 Haily Pass, Sublette County, Wyoming, el. 
 Hat Pass, Sublette County, Wyoming, el. 
 Hay Pass, Fremont County, Wyoming, el. 
 Hazenville Pass, Converse County, Wyoming, el. 
 Hell Gap, Goshen County, Wyoming, el. 
 Hoff Gap, Natrona County, Wyoming, el. 
 Hurricane Pass, Teton County, Wyoming, el. 
 Indian Gap, Sweetwater County, Wyoming, el. 
 Indian Pass, Fremont County, Wyoming, el. 
 Indian Pass, Fremont County, Wyoming, el. 
 Indian Pass, Fremont County, Wyoming, el. 
 Indian Pass, Park County, Wyoming, el. 
 Ishawooa Pass, Park County, Wyoming, el. 
 Jackass Pass, Fremont County, Wyoming, el. 
 Jackass Pass, Teton County, Wyoming, el. 
 Jenkins Pass, Converse County, Wyoming, el. 
 Johnson Canyon, Platte County, Wyoming, el. 
 Johnson Gap, Sweetwater County, Wyoming, el. 
 Jones Pass, Park County, Wyoming, el.

Notes

 
Wyoming
Mountain passes
Mountain passes